K.L.E. Society's S. Nijalingappa College (KLE SNC) is a college in Bangalore, India which offers PU and degree courses. It is affiliated to Bengaluru City University.

The college is under the management of Karnataka Lingayat Education Society,  which provides education to poor and needy students. There are many institutions under KLE Society which offer education ranging from kindergarten to double degree courses like M.Sc., Engineering, Dental, Medical, etc. Among all the KLE Society institutions, S. Nijalingappa College is meant for degree courses. It provides coaching for PU, undergraduate and post graduate degree courses in B.Sc; M.Sc; B.Com; BCA; BBM; M.Com; BHM; MTTM; Fashion Designing courses; B.A courses.

References

External links

Universities and colleges in Bangalore
Colleges affiliated to Bangalore University